Supermercados Tu Alteza (also known locally plainly as Tu Alteza, a name which translates to Your Highness) is a Canarian chain of supermarkets, which has 60 supermarkets operating in the Canary Islands. The supermarket's parent company is Comercial Jesuman.

History
Both Comercial Jesuman and the Tu Alteza supermarkets were founded by Jesus Hernandez Guzman. In 2005, one of his descendants, Jose Ignacio Hernandez, took over as the conglomerate's only administrator, creating an internal battle for control of the company between him and Hernandez Guzman's other descendants, namely Juan Jesus and Jose Manuel Hernandez.

Sponsorships
The supermarket chain sponsors the Tenerife Central women's basketball club.

Competitors
Competitors in the Canary Islands include Alcampo.

References

Supermarkets of Spain
Spanish brands
Food retailers in Spain